Hawkinson is a surname. Notable people with the surname include:

Carl Hawkinson (born 1947), American lawyer and politician
Tanner Hawkinson (born 1990), American football player
Tim Hawkinson (born 1960), American sculptor

English-language surnames